Ponto Belo is a municipality located in the Brazilian state of Espírito Santo. Its population was 7,940 (2020) and its area is 360 km2.

References

Municipalities in Espírito Santo